Dorota Staszewska (born 2 October 1978) is a Polish sports sailor. She was born in Warsaw. She competed at the 1996 Summer Olympics, in women's sailboard.

References

External links 
 
 
 

1978 births
Living people
Polish windsurfers
Female windsurfers
Polish female sailors (sport)
Olympic sailors of Poland
Sailors at the 1996 Summer Olympics – Mistral One Design
Sportspeople from Warsaw